The Melbourne Rebels Women are an Australian rugby union team that competes in the annual Super W competition, after Rugby Australia announced that a 15-a-side women's rugby competition would be launched in 2018.

History 
The Rebels Women ended the inaugural Super W season without a single win after a 57–0 loss to the NSW Waratahs in the final round; they were also held scoreless in two matches. The 2019 season also ended without a single win for the Rebels as they finished at the bottom of the table. They registered their first Super W win in the 2020 season after beating the Rugby WA team in round four of the regular season.

Current squad 
On 9 February 2022, the squad for the 2022 season was announced.

Season standings 
Super W

 {| class="wikitable" style="text-align:center;"
! style="width:20px;" |Year
!Pos
! style="width:20px;" |Pld
! style="width:20px;" |W
! style="width:20px;" |D
! style="width:20px;" |L
! style="width:20px;" |F
! style="width:20px;" |A
! style="width:40px;" |+/-
! style="width:20px;" |BP
! style="width:20px;" |Pts
!text-align:left;" | Play-offs
|-
|2021
|3rd, Pool B
|3
|0
|0
|3
|25
|57
|−32
|1
|1
| align="left" | Lost 5th place match to 
|-
|2020
|4th
|4
|1
|0
|3
|59
|188
|−129
|2
|6
| align="left" | Did not compete
|-
|2019
|5th
|4
|0
|0
|4
|22
|285
|−263
|0
|0
| align="left" | Did not compete
|-
|2018
|5th
|4
|0
|0
|4
|21
|239
|−218
|0
|0
| align="left" | Did not compete
|}

Coaches

Coaching staff 
The Melbourne Rebels confirmed a new coaching group for the upcoming 2023 Super W season.
 Head Coach: Jason Rogers
 Assistant Coach: Silei Etuale
 Assistant Coach: Luke Crameri

Notes

References

External links 

 Official website

2017 establishments in Australia
Rugby clubs established in 2017
Women's rugby union teams in Australia
Super W
Rugby union teams in Victoria (Australia)
Sporting clubs in Melbourne
Melbourne Rebels